Hornslet is a town located in East Jutland, on the southwestern part of the Djursland peninsula, Denmark. It is a commuter town of the city of Aarhus, which lies approximately 28 kilometers to the southwest, and a railway town at Grenaabanen, the railroad between the cities of Aarhus and Grenaa.  Hornslet is located in Syddjurs Municipality, which in turn is part of Region Midtjylland, and has a population of 6,171 (1 January 2022).

Rosenholm Castle, which belongs to the family Rosenkrantz, is located immediately outside the town. The castle was recently best known for having given facilities to DR's julekalender "Christmas at the Castle" from 1986.

In the past, Hornslet was the largest town in and municipal seat of Rosenholm Municipality. 1. January 2007, it was merged with the neighbouring municipality of Rønde, to form the current Syddjurs Municipality.

In 2008 a spectacular collapse of a wind turbine took place, which was filmed.

Notable people 
 Iver Rosenkrantz (1674 in at Rosenholm Castle – 1745) a Danish statesman and landowner, buried at Hornslet Church

References

 
Cities and towns in the Central Denmark Region
Syddjurs Municipality